"Jesus and Mama" is a song written by Danny Mayo and James Dean Hicks, and recorded by the American country music band Confederate Railroad. It was released in July 1992 as the second single from the band's self-titled debut album. The song peaked at number 4 on the Hot Country Singles & Tracks charts in and was later included as the b-side to the album's third single, "Queen of Memphis."

Critical reception
It received a positive review in Billboard, with the uncredited review calling the song "soft and believable".

Chart performance

Year-end charts

References

1992 singles
Confederate Railroad songs
Songs written by Danny Mayo
Song recordings produced by Barry Beckett
Atlantic Records singles
Songs written by James Dean Hicks
1992 songs